Ricardo Ferrero (5 April 1955 – 16 November 2015) was an Argentine professional footballer who played as a goalkeeper for Cruz Azul, Barcelona, and Racing de Santander. He later became a manager with Deportivo Toluca.

References

1955 births
2015 deaths
Argentine footballers
Cruz Azul footballers
FC Barcelona players
Racing de Santander players
Association football goalkeepers
Argentine football managers
Deportivo Toluca F.C. managers
Argentine expatriate footballers
Argentine expatriate football managers
Argentine expatriate sportspeople in Mexico
Expatriate footballers in Mexico
Expatriate football managers in Mexico
Argentine expatriate sportspeople in Spain
Expatriate footballers in Spain